Boulder Peak is a peak located in Washington state, in Olympic National Park.  The mountain is accessible by using the Olympic Hot Springs Trail and the Appleton Pass trail.  These two trails lead to Boulder Lake located at the base of Boulder Mountain where there is a campground.  There are no official trails to the top of the peak, but one can find a beaten path and with a fair amount of scrambling can reach the summit. The summit offers views of the surrounding Olympic Mountains and various lakes. The round trip from trail head to summit is approximately 13 miles.

References

External links
 

Mountains of Washington (state)
Mountains of Clallam County, Washington
Olympic Mountains
Landforms of Olympic National Park